Crichlow or Critchlow is a surname, and may refer to:

 Ernest Crichlow (1914–2005), African-American artist
 Frank Crichlow (1932–2010), British activist
 Herbie Crichlow (born 1968), English music producer and songwriter
 Jay Critch (born as Jason Cole Critchlow 1998), American rapper
 Kieran Crichlow (born 1981), former Barbadian footballer
 Lenora Crichlow (born 1985), British actress
 Nathaniel Crichlow (1922–2006)
 Renn Crichlow (born 1968), Canadian kayaker